Meansville is a city in Pike County, Georgia, United States. The population was 192 at the 2000 census.

History
The Georgia General Assembly incorporated Meansville as a town in 1913. According to tradition, the community was named for homesteader John Means.

Geography

Meansville is located at  (33.050024, -84.309706).

Demographics

As of the census of 2000, there were 192 people, 73 households, and 58 families residing in the city. The racial makeup of the city was 79.17% White, 17.19% African American, 2.08% Native American, 0.52% from other races, and 1.04% from two or more races. Hispanic or Latino of any race were 4.17% of the population.

There were 73 households, out of which 32.9% had children under the age of 18 living with them, 64.4% were married couples living together, 15.1% had a female householder with no husband present, and 19.2% were non-families. 17.8% of all households were made up of individuals, and 15.1% had someone living alone who was 65 years of age or older.  The average household size was 2.63 and the average family size was 2.97.

In the city, the population was spread out, with 26.0% under the age of 18, 6.8% from 18 to 24, 29.7% from 25 to 44, 20.3% from 45 to 64, and 17.2% who were 65 years of age or older.  The median age was 37 years. For every 100 females, there were 95.9 males.  For every 100 females age 18 and over, there were 94.5 males.

The median income for a household in the city was $33,125, and the median income for a family was $38,750. Males had a median income of $26,875 versus $21,406 for females. The per capita income for the city was $16,908.  About 4.4% of families and 5.8% of the population were below the poverty line, including 10.6% of those under the age of eighteen and none of those 65 or over.

Education
Meansville Public Schools are part of the Pike County School District. The school district has one Pre-K building (lottery funded), one primary school (K-2), one elementary school (3-5), one middle school (6-8), a ninth grade academy and two high schools.

Michael Duncan, Ed. D. is the Superintendent of Schools.

References

Cities in Georgia (U.S. state)
Cities in Pike County, Georgia